Nigade may refer to:
 Nigade, Mawal, Pune district, Maharashtra, India
 Nigade, Ratnagiri, Maharashtra, India